United Family Service (UFS) is a not-for-profit, family service organization based in Charlotte, North Carolina, with offices in Concord, Huntersville, Monroe and Mooresville, NC. United Family Services is a member of United Way of Central Carolinas, Inc. and is accredited by the Council on Accreditation.

History
United Family Services was founded in 1882 by 100 religious and business leaders who pledged $25 a year each to support the work of the organization. With offices in Cabarrus, Mecklenburg, Mooresville/S. Iredell and Union counties, United Family Services has 84 full-time employees and more than 250 active volunteers.

External links
United Family Services home

Non-profit organizations based in North Carolina
Organizations based in Charlotte, North Carolina